Manuel "Manu" Pérez Brunicardi  (born 22 August 1978) is a Spanish ski mountaineer.

Pérez was born in Segovia. He started ski mountaineering in 1995 and competed first in 1996. In 1999 he became a member of the national team. He won the Spanish Championships in a row from 2002 to 2006. In 2003 he ranked second in the international ISMC ranking and became "high level athlete" of the high sports council of the Spanish government (No. 70.241.363 - Moñana y Escalada).

Selected results
 2002:
 1st, Spanish Championship
 1st, Spanish Cup
 1st, Spanish Championship team race (together with Jordi Bes Ginesta)
 2003:
 1st, Spanish Championship single
 1st, Spanish Cup
 1st, Spanish Championship team race (together with Jordi Bes Ginesta)
 6th, European Championship relay race (together with Javier Martín de Villa, Germán Cerezo Alonso and Fernando Navarro Aznar)
 7th, European Championship team race (together with Jordi Bes Ginesta)
 7th, European Championship vertical race
 8th, European Championship single race
 2004:
 1st, Spanish Championship single
 4th, World Championship relay race (together with Agustí Roc Amador, Javier Martín de Villa and Dani León Roca)
 7th, World Championship vertical race
 2005:
 1st, Spanish Championship single
 1st, Spanish Cup
 2nd, Spanish Championship vertical race
 6th, World Cup race, Salt Lake City
 7th, European Championship vertical race
 9th, European Championship single race
 10th, World Cup team (together with Javier Martín de Villa)
 2006:
 1st, Spanish Championship single
 1st, Spanish Championship team
 1st, Spanish Cup
 2nd, Spanish Championship vertical race
 6th, World Championship relay race (together with Javier Martín de Villa, Federico Galera Díez and Agustí Roc Amador)
 2007:
 3rd, European Championship vertical race
 4th, European Championship relay race (together with Javier Martín de Villa, Agustí Roc Amador and Marc Solá Pastoret)
 10th, European Championship team race (together with Jordi Bes Ginesta)
 10th, European Championship combination ranking
 2008:
 3rd, World Championship relay race (together with Javier Martín de Villa, Marc Solá Pastoret and Kílian Jornet Burgada)
 2009:
 2nd, European Championship relay race (together with Javier Martín de Villa, Joan Maria Vendrell Martínez and Kílian Jornet Burgada)
 8th, European Championship combination ranking
 10th, European Championship team race (together with Jordi Bes Ginesta)
 2010:
 4th, World Championship relay race (together with Javier Martín de Villa, Marc Pinsach Rubirola and Kílian Jornet Burgada)

Patrouille des Glaciers

2000: 6th ("seniors I" class ranking), together with Federico Galera Díez and Jorge Palacio Sanz
2008: 9th ("civilian international men" ranking), together with Joan Maria Vendrell Martínez and Danile León Roca

References

External links
Manuel Pérez Brunicardi at skimountaineering.org
Manuel Pérez Brunicardi, website of the FEDME

1978 births
Living people
Spanish male ski mountaineers
People from Segovia
Sportspeople from the Province of Segovia